Trufanovo is a rural locality (a village) in Kichmengskoye Rural Settlement, Kichmengsko-Gorodetsky District, Vologda Oblast, Russia. The population was 25 as of 2002.

Geography 
Trufanovo is located 12 km northeast of Kichmengsky Gorodok (the district's administrative centre) by road. Martynovo is the nearest locality.

References 

Rural localities in Kichmengsko-Gorodetsky District